St Mary's and All Saints is a parish church in Boxley, Kent begun in the 13th century and with additions in the 14th and 15th centuries. The church was restored in the 1870s. It is a Grade I listed building.

Building

Structure
The church is constructed with uncoursed local rag-stone and flint walls and plain tiled roofs. The nave is flanked by aisles on each side and the chancel has a vestry on the south side. The tower at the west end of the nave has a narthex on its west side, being the remains of an earlier church.

The tower is formed in three stages with buttressed corners and a battlemented parapet. A stair turret is attached to the north-east corner and belfry windows are located on the top floor on each side. The narthex has a half-hipped roof with a restored three-lighted perpendicular gothic window set left of centre on the west face above the entrance door. Smaller two-lighted windows are positioned at low level in the north and south walls.

The north and south aisles feature variously sized and detailed two-lighted decorated gothic windows on their flank and end walls. The centre bay of the south aisle is occupied by the south porch. The windows in the chancel and the vestry on its south side are 19th-century.

Interior
The interior of the narthex features remains of Norman arcading and a common rafter roof. The doorways through the east and west walls of the tower are perpendicular with the one on the west having carvings of a bishop and a king in the moulding over.

The north and south sides of the nave are divided from the aisles on each side with early 13th-century arcades of three bays on short circular piers. The chancel arch is early perpendicular. The roofs of the nave is early 15th-century with moulded crown post trusses. The scissor braced roofs to the aisles are 13th-century. The chancel roof is thought to be 19th-century. The east ends of each aisle contain a piscina. The font is 19th-century on an early 15th-century base.

Bells
There is a ring of six bells (tenor  in F sharp) hung in the English style for full circle ringing.

Memorials and monuments

The church contains memorials to Sir Henry Wiat of Allington Castle (d. 1537, erected 1702), Richard Tomynn (d. 1576), George and Elizabeth Charlton (d. 1707 and d. 1750), Hannah Champneys (d. 1748), William Champneys (d. 1760) and Frances Champneys (d. 1800).

The lychgate constructed in 1875 is listed separately as a Grade II listed structure. The churchyard contains a large number of Grade II listed monuments and headstones.

See also
Boxley Abbey
Boxley Abbey Barn
Grade I listed buildings in Maidstone

References

Borough of Maidstone
12th-century church buildings in England
Grade I listed churches in Kent
Church of England church buildings in Kent
Diocese of Canterbury